The Euro Hockey League 2018–19 was the twelfth season of the Euro Hockey League, Europe's premier club field hockey tournament, organized by the European Hockey Federation. Round One was held in Barcelona from 5 until 7 October 2018 and the knockout stage was held in Eindhoven from 17 until 22 April 2019.

The final was played between Waterloo Ducks and Rot-Weiss Köln. The Waterloo Ducks defeated Rot-Weis Köln 4–0 to become the first Belgian club to win the Euro Hockey League. Mannheimer HC took the bronze medal and Gonzalo Peillat became the top scorer with nine goals.

Association team allocation

A total of 24 teams from 12 of the 45 EHF member associations participated in the 2018–19 Euro Hockey League. The association ranking based on the EHL country coefficients is used to determine the number of participating teams for each association:
 Associations 1–4 each have three teams qualify.
 Associations 5–8 each have two teams qualify.
 Associations 9–12 each have one team qualify.

EHL Rankings

Qualified teams
The following teams qualified for the 2018-19 Euro Hockey League. 12 teams got a bye to the KO16.

Format Changes
The EHL board has decided not to continue with the field goal equals two trial, used last season, so this season every goal will return to equaling one whether it comes from the field or a penalty corner. Due to the overcrowded international hockey calendar from 2019 onwards because of the 2019 Men's FIH Pro League, the EHL has combined the KO16 and FINAL4 events at Easter, making a six-day event from April 17 to 22, 2019.

Round One 
Round One was held from 5 until 7 October 2018 at the Pau Negre Stadium in Barcelona. The draw took place on 17 July 2018. If a game is won, the winning team receives 5 points. A draw results in both teams receiving 2 points. A loss gives the losing team 1 point unless the losing team loses by 3 or more goals, then they receive 0 points. 

All times are local, CET (UTC+1).

Pool A

Pool B

Pool C

Pool D

Knockout stage
The knockout stage took place at Sportpark Aalsterweg in Eindhoven, Netherlands from 17 until 22 April 2019. The draw took place at 21 October 2018 and the schedule was announced on 15 November 2018.

''All times are local, CET (UTC+1).

Qualified teams
The knockout phase involves 16 teams, consisting of the 4 pool winners and the 12 already qualified teams.

Bracket

Round of 16

Ranking matches

Quarter-finals

Semi-finals

Bronze medal match

Final

See also
2019 EuroHockey Club Champions Cup
2019 Men's EuroHockey Club Trophy
2019 Men's EuroHockey Indoor Club Cup

References

External links 
 Official Website (English)
 European Hockey Federation

Euro Hockey League
2018–19 in European field hockey